KTDM (107.5 FM) was a radio station licensed to Wheatland, Wyoming, United States. The station was owned by Victor and Van Michael, through licensee Michael Radio Group.

On August 27, 2014, the station's owners notified the Federal Communications Commission that KTDM had been silent since June 13, 2013, and requested cancellation of the station's license.

References

External links

TDM
Defunct radio stations in the United States
Radio stations disestablished in 2014
Radio stations established in 2009
2009 establishments in Wyoming
2014 disestablishments in Wyoming
TDM